Imbricaria insculpta is a species of sea snail, a marine gastropod mollusk in the family Mitridae, the miters or miter snails.

Description
The length of the shell varies between 16 mm and 28 mm.

Distribution
This marine species occurs in the Indo-West Pacific and off Vietnam and the Philippines.

References

External links

 Sowerby, G. B., II. (1870). Descriptions of forty-eight new species of shells. Proceedings of the Zoological Society of London. 1870: 249-259
 Fedosov A., Puillandre N., Herrmann M., Kantor Yu., Oliverio M., Dgebuadze P., Modica M.V. & Bouchet P. (2018). The collapse of Mitra: molecular systematics and morphology of the Mitridae (Gastropoda: Neogastropoda). Zoological Journal of the Linnean Society. 183(2): 253-337.

Mitridae
Gastropods described in 1851